Almon Secord Rennie (17 August 1882 – 26 October 1949) was a Canadian businessman and politician. Rennie was a Liberal party member of the House of Commons of Canada. He was born in Linwood, Ontario and became a merchant by career.

Rennie attended schools at Linwood, then Westervelt Business College in London. In 1928 and 1929, he served as Ontario Grand Master for the Independent Order of Odd Fellows, and at one point chaired the association's Home Board based in Toronto.

From 1922 to 1924, Rennie was mayor of Tillsonburg, Ontario, and served as a deputy reeve for Oxford County council.

He was first elected to Parliament at the Oxford South riding in a by-election on 16 April 1934. After riding boundary changes, Rennie won the new Oxford riding in the 1935 election, and re-elected in 1940. Rennie was defeated in 1945 by Kenneth Daniel of the Progressive Conservatives.

References

External links
 

1882 births
1949 deaths
Canadian merchants
Liberal Party of Canada MPs
Mayors of places in Ontario
Members of the House of Commons of Canada from Ontario
People from the Regional Municipality of Waterloo
People from Tillsonburg